The Scandal is a 2013 South Korean television series starring Kim Jaewon, Jo Yoon-hee, Cho Jae-hyun, Park Sang-min, Shin Eun-kyung, Ki Tae-young, Kim Hye-ri, and Kim Gyu-ri. It aired on MBC from June 29 to October 27, 2013 on Saturdays and Sundays at 21:45 for 36 episodes. This drama commemorated Seoul Olympics' 25th anniversary.

Plot
Detective Ha Eun-joong uncovers a shocking secret; Ha Myung-geun, the man he believed was his father, had actually kidnapped him as a child. Myung-geun had lost his own son in a building collapse, and as revenge against the man responsible, Jang Tae-ha, he abducted Tae-ha's son and raised him as his own. In the aftermath of revenge, Eun-joong searches for the truth and becomes caught between his two fathers and the woman he loves, Woo Ah-mi.

Cast

Main characters
Kim Jaewon as Ha Eun-joong
Jung Yoon-seok as 8-year-old Ha Eun-joong
Kim Hwi-soo as 5-year-old Ha Eun-joong
Detective at Gangnam police station. He became a detective to try to understand his father, an ex-detective, better. Why did his dad quit the force in 1988? What happened to him that he became a construction foreman? Why did he adopt him but never fully accept him as his son? One day, he begins investigating the death of Gong Ki-chan, a construction worker, and becomes entangled with the Jang family and the dead man's fiancée, Woo Ah-mi.

Cho Jae-hyun as Ha Myung-geun
He is a loving father to Ha Eun-joong and Ha Soo-young. But he is also Ha Eun-joong's kidnapper. His wife died while giving birth to Soo-young and that left him caring for his two kids all by himself. Jang Tae-ha, chairman of Taeha Construction firm, was responsible for the shoddy construction of a building that collapsed, killing Myung-geun's son. When Tae-ha falsifies evidence to escape prosecution and doesn't show any remorse for the collapse, Myung-geun kidnapped Jang's son to get revenge. A few years later, filled with regret and his conscience eating at him, he decides to take Eun-joong back to his real family. Outside the house, he sees that they already have a son, the fake Eun-joong. He goes home with Eun-joong, and finally his heart is free to love him and raise him as his own.

Park Sang-min as Jang Tae-ha
Chairman of Taeha conglomerate and one of the wealthiest individuals in Korea. He is the father of Jang Eun-joong and Jang Joo-ha. Stylish and trendy, he has a fiery temper when crossed.

Shin Eun-kyung as Yoon Hwa-young
Tae-ha's estranged wife, a rational and cool-headed lawyer and head of her own firm. She was devastated when her son Eun-joong was abducted. To prevent Tae-ha from divorcing her and marrying his mistress Joo-ran, she adopted a boy from an orphanage and passed him off as Tae-ha's son Jang Eun-joong. But all these years, she is still searching for her real son.

Jo Yoon-hee as Woo Ah-mi
She owns a lunch stand where many people preparing for the state police exams take cram courses. She wanted to become a prosecutor but soon realized that she could never pass the bar exam. Following the death of her husband and unborn daughter caused by Tae-ha, Myung-geun takes her in as he feels like it is his fault. She is determined to find justice for her husband, and along the way she begins to find out shocking secrets and develops feelings for Ha Eun-joong. She's honest, thoughtful, measured in her behavior, well-balanced and simple-minded. She cries a lot, talks a lot, gives loves and has a quick temper.

Ki Tae-young as Jang Eun-joong 
Jung Joon-won as 8-year-old Jang Eun-joong
Tae-ha and Hwa-young's son, he is a lawyer and becomes Ha Eun-joong's rival.

Kim Hye-ri as Go Joo-ran
Tae-ha's mistress. She is determined to get rid of Tae-ha's wife and their son, Eun-joong, to get her position in Tae-ha's household and for her daughter's sake in Tae-ha's company.

Kim Gyu-ri as Jang Joo-ha
Jo Min-ah as young Jang Joo-ha
Tae-ha and Joo-ran's daughter; she is a career woman who works for her father's company.

Supporting characters
Jo Han-chul as Shin Kang-ho
Choi Cheol-ho as Kang Joo-pil
Ahn Suk-hwan as Jo Chi-gook
Han Groo as Ha Soo-young
Lee Ye-sun as young Ha Soo-young
Myung-geun's daughter, Ha Eun-joong's sister.

Park Jung-chul as Jo Jin-woong
Jin Ju-hyung as Detective Goo
Park Min-woo as hacker Batman
Jo Hwi-joon as Ha Gun-young
Kim Hyun as Go Joo-ran's aide
Choi Yong-min as Taeha Construction worker
Jung Ho-keun as Taeha Construction worker
Jung Kyu-soo as section head Song Jae-moon
Hong Jae-sung as Detective Lee
Yang Jin-woo as Gong Ki-chan
Ah-mi's fiancé and father of their then-unborn child. Ki-chan was Myung-geun's protege and working as a construction worker. He discovers anomalies in the project and confronts Jang Tae-ha. He ends up dead on his supposed wedding day.
Hong Yeo-jin as Ki-chan's mother
Kim Hae-gon as inspection team leader
Han Ki-won as Kim Joong-hyuk
Choi Hee-seo as Secretary Moon

Production 
 The series is the third collaboration between screenwriter Bae Yoo-mi and director Kim Jin-man after Country Princess (2003) and Love Truly (2006).

Ratings 
In the table below, the blue numbers represent the lowest ratings and the red numbers represent the highest ratings.

Awards and nominations

References

External links
  
 
 The Scandal at MBC Global Media
 

Korean-language television shows
2013 South Korean television series debuts
2013 South Korean television series endings
MBC TV television dramas
South Korean melodrama television series
South Korean romance television series